Martinov may refer to:

 Martinov (Ostrava) – district of Ostrava, Czech Republic
 Martinov (Záryby) – part of the village of Záryby, Czech Republic
 Martinov Russian Botanist